John McCormack is a journalist and the Washington correspondent for National Review.

In a 2013 interview of journalist Robert Costa, Costa cites, among others, two examples of "great reporters" for conservative outlets.  One of them is John McCormack.

Early in his career as a journalist, McCormack was an intern for National Review in Washington, D.C. He later became a senior writer for The Weekly Standard from 2007 to 2018.

McCormack has appeared on a range of radio and TV news programs, including MSNBC's Morning Joe, CNN's Inside Politics, HBO’s Real Time, NPR's On Point, and Fox News' programs such as Special Report with Bret Baier.

McCormack, a native of Baldwin, Wisconsin, lives with his wife Lauren in Alexandria, Virginia.

References

External links
 John McCormack | National Review, including article links. 
 John McCormack (@McCormackJohn) | Twitter

Living people
American newspaper reporters and correspondents
American political writers
American political journalists
American male writers
National Review people
The Weekly Standard people
Year of birth missing (living people)